The MLW World Heavyweight Championship is a world heavyweight championship owned and promoted by Major League Wrestling (MLW). It is the promotion's principal championship. The championship was established on September 26, 2002 during the MLW Reload event and was active until February 10, 2004 after the promotion stopped hosting events.

History

On June 15, 2002, Major League Wrestling held an eight-man single-elimination tournament to crown the first MLW Champion at its inaugural Genesis event. Jerry Lynn, Shane Douglas, Vampiro and Taiyo Kea advanced to the semifinals. Douglas defeated Lynn to advance to the finals, and caused the match between Vampiro and Kea to be declared a no contest. As a result, both wrestlers advanced to the finals for a three-way dance. Douglas defeated both Kea and Vampiro to become the first champion. Afterwards, Douglas threw the title down, like he did with the NWA World Heavyweight Championship. Referee John Finnegan threatened that Douglas would be banned from wrestling in Philadelphia, if he didn't defend the title. MLW went on hiatus for three months.

Upon the company's return, Satoshi Kojima defeated Jerry Lynn in New York City, New York at MLW Reload on September 26 for the vacant MLW World Heavyweight Championship. Court Bauer would later confirm that this title lineage and belt design was a separate championship from the MLW Championship won by Shane Douglas in June 2002. As such, Kojima was recognised as the first MLW World Heavyweight Champion. Kojima defended the title in his home promotion All Japan Pro Wrestling (AJPW), with the defenses airing on both MLW Underground TV and AJPW broadcasts in Japan. Kojima lost the title at Hybrid Hell on June 20, 2003 to Mike Awesome. Afterwards, Awesome lost the title to Steve Corino, as Corino exercised Awesome's promise for a title shot. It was later reported that Kojima's employers, AJPW would not allow him to drop the title to an employee of a rival company Pro Wrestling Zero1, which was Steve Corino. Corino remained champion until the promotion closed on February 10, 2004.

MLW resumed wrestling operations in July 2017. In January 2018, MLW announced its Road to the World Championship, an eight-man single-elimination tournament to crown a new champion. During the tournament, A. C. H. replaced Tom Lawlor in the semi-finals, after he suffered an injury. On April 12, Shane Strickland defeated Matt Riddle in The World Championship Finals. Low Ki made the first international title defense since 2003 in Claremont, Australia, as he defeated Jonah Rock on November 30 in a New Horizon Pro Wrestling event. Starting in July 2019, MLW would begin playing a Championship Lineage video (similar to New Japan Pro Wrestling) highlighting all previous MLW World Heavyweight Champions before sanctioned Championship matches. This lineage package would once again confirm Shane Douglas as not recognised as part of the MLW World Heavyweight Championship History.

Championship Tournaments

Inaugural MLW World Championship Tournament (2002)

Road to the Championship tournament (2018)

Reigns
As of February 13, 2022, there have been nine reigns and one vacancy shared between nine different champions. Shane Douglas was the inaugural champion, defeating Taiyo Kea and Vampiro at Genesis on June 15, 2002, to become the inaugural champion. Jacob Fatu's reign is the longest at 819 days, while Mike Awesome's reign is the shortest at 10 minutes. Low Ki is the oldest champion when he won it at 39 years old, while Shane Strickland is the youngest champion at 28 years old.

Alexander Hammerstone is the current champion in his first reign. He defeated Jacob Fatu in a Winner Takes All match where Hammerstone's MLW National Openweight Championship was also on the line at Fightland on October 2, 2021, in Philadelphia, Pennsylvania.

References

External links 
  at Cagematch.net
  at Wrestling-Titles.com

World
World heavyweight wrestling championships
World professional wrestling championships